Cumhuriyet (Laz language: Mshke) is a quarter of the town Hopa, Hopa District, Artvin Province, Turkey. Its population is 483 (2021). Most inhabitants of the neighbourhood are ethnically Laz.

References

Hopa District
Laz settlements in Turkey